Mills County is a county located in Central Texas. It was created on March 15, 1887, from parts of four existing counties—Brown, Comanche, Hamilton, and Lampasas. The 2020 census reported a population of 4,456. The county seat is Goldthwaite.

History

The Clovis are the earliest known people to inhabit the territory before Mills County, though recent discoveries indicate that there were people living in the area as far back as 15,000 to 20,000 years. More recently, the Tonkawa occupied it, and there are numerous vestiges from their campsites that remain across the county, including cooking middens. Thought to be the first white man to explore pre-Mills County, Pedro Vial visited in 1786 and 1789 while traveling between San Antonio and Santa Fe.

The Comanche regularly hunted in pre-Mills County since it was located along the southeastern edge of a large buffalo range. Native tribes moved through the area via what locals called "The Comanche Trail," which led to southern Texas. Starting in the 1840s, aggressive groups of Comanche and Apache pushed the Tonkawa out and raided the area in an effort to keep control of it as late as 1850, frequently stealing horses and scalping settlers who had started to move there in numbers after 1855. The earliest settlers arrived when there were no fences and land was free. 

Eventually the Apaches moved west, leaving the Comanche in control. Earlier, in 1835, the General Council of Texas sent the first Texas Rangers to aid settlers. In 1854, the Texas Legislature appropriated land located on the Texas frontier, built a series of reservations, and moved the natives there starting in 1855, yet there continued to be native incursions into white settlements. By the mid-1870s, native violence began to diminish, yet leading up to the 1880s, Comanche and Kiowa continued to attack the area. Comanches raided Williams Ranch in the late 1870s, the last recorded assault.

The earliest communities in pre-Mills County were Center City and Hanna Valley, both organized in 1854. One source identifies the David Morris, Sr., and Dick Jenkins families as the first pioneers in the area, who settled south of present-day Center City in 1852. Killed by the natives, Dick Jenkins is thought to be the first person buried in what was to become Mills County. 

Williams Ranch, established in 1855 in Brown County, was the first community that developed into a large, dynamic town after establishing trade with Mexico and serving as a major center for cattle business, capitalizing on its location near the Western Cattle Trail. The town served as the "headquarters" of the West Texas frontier and was expected to serve as the county seat. A telegraph line passed through Williams Ranch, connecting Austin and Concho (San Angelo), and was thought to be the longest line in the United States. 

A federal military facility, Camp Colorado, was established in 1856 near the community of Ebony. Numerous wagon and stage coach trails crisscrossed the area during this time. "Fort Phantom Hill Trail," a military route that connected Fort Phantom Hill and Austin, passed through the territory.

During the Civil War and following Reconstruction, an unprecedented number of people moved west looking for a better life, attracted by plentiful and inexpensive land. Some of them settled in the area before Mills County formed and helped establish the early communities. Records demonstrate that 1876 marked the largest influx of immigrants into the area.

Most of the early settlers lived according to Christian principles they brought with them that were reinforced by religious leaders in their new communities. That said, gun altercations to settle differences were common, and legal repercussions were usually immaterial.

This isolated part of Texas, popularly referred to as a "no man's land," also attracted a variety of criminals, and minimal and often corrupt law enforcement allowed crime to surge. The first law officer was W.W. Queen, who took his position in 1883 before Mills County formed; there are no reliable records documenting the existence of law enforcement officers before then. Other sustained problems roiled the area, including native incursions, conflicts related to the cattle business, community feuds, agrarian discontent, and political unrest. This tumultuous environment was a crucible for violence. Only a few pioneers joined the Confederate Army during the Civil War because they were needed at home to fight their own "war" against the attacks of natives and outlaws.

Originally organized to protect settlers, vigilante "committees" formed with the tacit approval of law officials that degenerated into thieving, vindictive, and murderous groups that terrorized the area, killing an estimated one hundred people—many of them innocent—during their reign in Central Texas. Also known as "The Assembly," they were veiled in secrecy and bound by a strict code of silence, which heightened settlers' fear. The earliest one started at Williams Ranch in 1869, called the "Honest Man's Club," that was supposed to rid the town of criminals. Soon a feud erupted between it and another group, the "Trigger Mountain Mob," which was the salvo that launched the mob's rule. Groups operating in Mills County were sometimes collectively referred to as "The Mills County Mob." The mob's control of the area started to subside with the arrival of the railroad in 1887, which helped bring civilized norms. The Texas Rangers were eventually called to the territory in 1890 to quell the mob's depravities, though its activity continued into the early twentieth century.

By 1885, the pre-Mills area had reached a population of 6,493 and had become civilized enough to justify forming a new county. At the time, the only significant communities were Center City, Mullin, Star, and Williams Ranch. Even so, both Goldthwaite and Mullin were only tent villages.

Known as "The Father of Mills County," district representative and Williams Ranch resident Phil H. Clements (1854–1932) lobbied in Austin for a new county in 1887, though planning for the county had started in 1885. There was opposition to creating the new county—Brown County, in particular, fought against it.

In an action of the twentieth Texas Legislature, Governor L.S. "Sul" Ross approved H.S.S.B. No. 85 on March 15, 1887, which carved Mills County out of parts of Brown, Comanche, Hamilton, and Lampasas counties—all of which were created much earlier in the mid-to-late 1850s.  It was named after John T. Mills, honoring his service as a Republic of Texas Supreme Court justice. The bill provided directions for conducting an  election to determine government leaders and the location of the county seat.  

An earlier piece of legislation, House Bill No. 421, would have created a county with a similar boundary as Mills called "Key," but the bill was defeated on February 21, 1881. An early General Land Office map dated March 10, 1879, references Mills County and names a place in the center of the county, "Winona."

Most newly elected Mills County officials first met in Goldthwaite on September 12, 1887, recognized as the  date the county was organized. A special election held on October 10, 1889, determined Goldthwaite as the county seat, beating Mullin and Pegtown. The first legal actions at the Mills County Clerk's office was to issue a marriage license and to file a divorce suit, and both transactions were instigated by Black couples.

Geography, topography, and natural features 
Located in West Central Texas, Mills County lies between the Limestone Cut Plains and Western Cross Timbers subregions of the Cross Plains ecoregion. Elevation varies from 1,200 to 1,750 feet.

The Colorado River marks the county's distinctive southwestern border and creates three fertile farming valleys: Big Valley, Jones Valley, and Hanna Valley. The Pecan Bayou enters the western part of the county from Brown County then flows east and south towards the Colorado River; Blanket and Brown creeks unite into the Pecan Bayou along the way. From west to east, the following streams drain into the Colorado River: Comanche Creek, Buffalo Creek, Rough Creek, King Creek, Pecan Bayou, Prescott Creek, Bull Creek, Nabors Creek, and Shaw Creek. North and South Bennett Creeks and Simms Creek, all in th eastern part of the county, drain into the Lampasas River. The northern parts of the county have Mountain Creek, Cowhouse Creek, and Washboard Creek that eventually drain into the Brazos River.

The Cowhouse Mountains, which are part of an extensive range of hills located in the Lampasas Cut Plain, cross the county from the southeast to the northwest. One part of the Cowhouse range enters the county north of Star and leaves the county north of Priddy; another part of Cowhouse enters the county near Moline before taking a northwesterly exit into Comanche County. San Saba Peak, at a height of 1,712 feet, is a prominent mountain in the county and was named in 1732 by Don Juan Antonio Bustillo y Cevallos, Spanish Governor of Texas.

Central Texas, which includes Mills County, contains some of the oldest rocks in the state.

The county has a variety of soils, including gray loams, sandy dark and stone clay, and alluvia in the bottom lands, and black wax on the prairies. Very shallow to deep, loamy, and clayey soils and their sub-varieties make up the bulk of the county. Plentiful limestone, sand, and gravel are used for road construction.

Native timbers include live oak (entire county), post oak (entire county), Spanish oak (Grand Prairie Region), eastern cottonwood (along streams), shinnery oak (Cowhouse Mountains Region), mesquite (concentrated in western county), pecan (along streams), and cedar. Cactus varieties typically grow in the Cross Timbers Region. Dominant trees and shrubs include ashe juniper (Juniperus ashei J. Bucholz), escarpment live oak (Quercus fusiformis Small), and the deciduous shrub, honey mesquite (Prosopis glandulosa Torr). A member of the Cypress family, ashe juniper is one of six species of the Juniperus genus that grow in Texas, but it is the only one that grows in the Hill Country, including Mills County, where it is concentrated in the southern region. It is the most plentiful native tree growing in the county and has existed in the area for thousands of years. Both Ashe juniper and honey mesquite are considered to be invasive trees in the area.

The county flower is the Texas Plume Standing Cypress.

Adjacent counties 
 Brown County (northwest)
 Comanche County (north)
 Hamilton County (northeast)
 Lampasas County (southeast)
 San Saba County (southwest)

Climate 
Mills County typically offers hot summers and cool winters. Rainfall tends to be spread throughout the year, and snowfall is infrequent. Sixty percent, or about sixteen inches, of annual rainfall typically falls from April through September. Averaging fourteen miles per hour, prevailing winds come from the south-southeast. The Köppen Climate Classification for Goldthwaite, the county seat, is "humid subtropical" (Cfa).

Highest monthly precipitation  was 13.71 inches, recorded in October 2018.

Communities (both living and defunct) 

 Bethel - one of a trio of towns located near each other that also included North Bennett and Liveoak
 Big Valley - located near the Colorado River in the southwestern part of the county; once in Lampasas County; settled as early as 1859; divided into Upper Big Valley and Lower Big Valley; since early 1870s, identified as the "backbone" of Mills County agricultural production; upper and lower valley schools consolidated about 1921, when a new school building was erected; post office discontinued in early 1900s; known as the "Gateway to San Saba County"; citizens left the lower valley in the early 1940s when the land became a one-thousand acre pecan orchard owned by the Leonard Brothers
 Bull's Creek - an early settlement started by James (Jim) Bull near the eponymous creek south of Goldthwaite around 1859; its school was started in 1899 before consolidating with Fairview to form Cedar Knob in 1917; it also had a cemetery
 Caradan - originally known as "Lookout"; established in 1898 and named after Sam Caraway and Dan Bush, both early settlers; Lookout School built around 1878; Live Oak School District recognized in 1888; Midway School was the result of the consolidation of North Bennett and Gray in 1913, consolidated with Goldthwaite in 1947
 Cedar Knob - early settlers were W.N. Sullivan and A.C. Sullivan, sheep farmers; schoolhouse erected that also served as church and prompted renaming the community "Fairview"; school consolidated with Bull's Creek and called "Cedar Knob" before finally consolidating with Goldthwaite
 Center City - located ten miles east of Goldthwaite and first known as Hughes Store. It was named for an old oak tree, "center oak," that an 1870s survey identified as the center of Texas. The first Justice Court proceedings, presided over by Judge J.P.  Grundy, were carried out between 1887 and 1890 under the tree before Mills County formed. The tree also furnished shade for the first school classes. In the early 1870s, many expected Center City to be named county seat as a logical choice based on its history as a hub for freight and stage line. A town square plan was developed by Mr. and Mrs. Hughes that accommodated a courthouse, and eventually a list of businesses sprung up, including several saloons, a drug store, two blacksmith shops, a hotel, and several other stores. It was a centrally located resting point for postal carriers. Its first church was organized in 1875 and was used for school and lodge. During its peak, the population is estimated to have reach 1,000 citizens. Likewise, residents anticipated the railroad to pass through the town, but it did not.
 Chappell Hill - an influx of settlers effected it being created out of the North Brown Community; an early member of the community was Mrs. B.T. Boydson, who moved there in 1893; mountainous part of the county; only schoolhouse constructed 1898–1899;
 Chesser Valley - was located about six miles from Williams Ranch; named after John Dan Chesser; known for hosting camp meetings/revivals that attracted large groups that camped in nearby Live Oak groves; once had the largest school in Brown County with fifty students
 Duren - located six miles northeast of Mullin; named after Philip David Duren, who first settled in Williams Ranch in 1876 but bought land where Duren would be located; in the 1870s through late 1880s, land owners in Duren would pay property taxes in three counties: Comanche, Brown and Mills; the school district was known as Pompey Mountain School District No. 6; two successive buildings served as the school (Duren School) and church (Pompey Mountain), and in 1961 a new church building opened.
 Ebony - Originally in Brown County and located in the far western part of Mills County with the Colorado River as its southern border, Ebony's earliest settler was James Ransom Wilmeth, Sr.; settlers came in numbers starting in the mid-1870s; called "Buffalo Valley" until the post office arrived between 1891 and 1894, with the name "Ebony" supplied by the postal service (earlier, mail came from Regency); a series of schools starting with one located near Buffalo Creek and the Reeves School; those schools consolidated in 1912 and culminated with the construction of a new school that was built across from the cemetery; the school consolidated with Mullin in 1947 (or 1949); the community started declining in the late 1930s after it was claimed by Camp Bowie in Brownwood and used as a military training area.
 Goldthwaite
 Hanna Valley - located near the Colorado River and established by David Hanna in 1854; first permanent settlement; Hanna assisted in starting Brown County; his daughter is thought to be the first white child born in would later become Mills County; it also hosted the first post office in the area in 1875.
 Hogg -  organized by J.L. Spurlin and planned to be located nine miles from Center City, two miles from Lometa, and twelve miles from Goldthwaite
 Jones Valley/Ratler - located west of Goldthwaite near the Colorado River; started growing around the 1900; had a school which consolidated with Goldthwaite; once the home of Willis Mill and associated vineyard.
 Kelly - located near Pleasant Grove and eight miles southeast of Goldthwaite, Kelly was in Lampasas County before Mills County formed. Its only community building was a school, named after Dan Kelly and his son, Neal, that also served as a church known as "Sims Creek Baptist"; it burned in 1909 and was rebuilt the same year; later it was burned and rebuilt; school consolidated with Goldthwaite in the early 1940s. The community was also called "Polecat."
 Lake Merritt - located about seven miles north of Goldthwaite with about 190 square acres of land; construction of the lake began in 1915 to supply water to the Santa Fe Railroad; the Lake Merritt School was built in 1919 and consolidated with North Brown and Cryer schools; in 1933 the school consolidated with Trigger Mountain school to establish the New Lake Merritt School
 Liveoak - one of a trio of towns located near each other that also included North Bennett and Bethel; its school consolidated with Goldthwaite in 1940
 Miller Grove - located about six miles southwest of Goldthwaite [or four and one-half miles northwest of Goldthwaite?], the community once had an eponymously named school, first name the "Hunt School."
 Mount Olive - located about ten miles northeast of Goldthwaite; began developing around 1890 and named after John Neal, who was the first permanent settler in 1887; church building used as a school; its school consolidated with Goldthwaite in 1949.
 Mullin
 Nabors Creek - settled c. 1870; named after the sheepherder who settled it when it was in Lampasas County; bordered to the south and west by the Colorado River; first schoolhouse built around 1900; the school consolidated with Golthwaite in 1947
 North Bennett - one of a trio of towns located near each other that also included Bethel and Liveoak; students from North Bennett attended Midway, which consolidated with Goldthwaite in 1947
 Payne Gap - was located southeast of Goldthwaite; Barzilla Payne arrived in 1856 and established it after signing for the pre-empted land in 1857; Payne was scalped by the Comanches in 1863
 Pleasant Grove - established around 1862 based on the arrival of its earliest known settler, Joe Curtis. The community had a school which was enlarged to three rooms in 1933–1934; it closed in 1946; a spring-fed pool called "Blue Hole" was a major center of pioneer life in the area.
 Priddy
 Regency
 Ridge - located about fifteen miles west of Goldthwaite and home to the "hanging tree," where a horse thief (Sebe Arnold) was hung; originally created by Mills County Commissioners court in 1888 as "Cold Springs"; began known as Ridge after the post office was established sometime between 1917 and 1920; a succession of four schoolhouses existed there, the final one built in 1931; much of the land was taken by Camp Bowie in Brownwood during WWII
 Rock Springs - located five miles west of Goldthwaite and north of Hanna Valley Road, where five springs provided water; the first to settle there was John Tisdale in 1874; the last school building was built in 1894, and the school consolidated with Goldthwaite in 1946
 Rye Valley - settled around 1881in an area bound to the south and southeast close to a horseshoe bend of the Colorado River; known for its fertile land and for the large rye grass the settlers found there; had a school, which burned once and moved several times in its history before locating centrally in 1919
 Scallorn - originally called Antelope Gap and located in southern Mills County, originally in Lampasas County; had a schoolhouse, which burned in 1905 and rebuilt; school district was the Minor School District, which merged with Goldthwaite in 1937 before combining with Lometa in 1943; Antelope Gap named Scallorn after the post office arrived and name after "Gid" Scallorn, foreman of the C-Ranch, once the largest ranch in Mills County
 South Bennett - established around 1870 and located about six miles southeast of Goldthwaite; named after South Bennett Creek; its school consolidated with Goldthwaite in the late 1930s; a jaguar was killed in 1903 near the community by Henry Morris, the only one killed in Mills County
 Star
 Tater Hill
 Trigger Mountain Community - located about five miles north of Goldthwaite near Trigger Mountain, which was named after Welcome Chandler's horse, "Trigger," which was found on top of the mountain/hill following an Indian attack. Chandler would later become a founder of Brownwood. The community had a church and school.
 Washboard - named after the eponymous formation of Washboard Creek in northern Mills County, about three miles west of Indian Gap, Hamilton County; the first settlers arrived in the 1860s; in the mid-1930s, the school consolidated with Priddy
 Williams Ranch

Demographics 

A 2022 report showed that home values in Mills County increased at a record rate compared to other counties in the state, rising by 98.7% since November 2017. An average home ballooned from $179,000 to over $355,000.

Religion 
Early settlers in the mid-1850s represented a range of faiths, led in numbers by the Methodists. During the county's formation days, denominations were less important. Early sermons were delivered by circuit riders, and a Methodist rider delivered the first religious service at the home of Charles Mullin in 1857. Later brush arbor revivals became popular before camp meetings started attracting congregants.

A 1972 study canvassing citizens of Star and Center City revealed that a majority of citizens had Protestant fundamentalist spiritual beliefs, with over 80% affiliated with Baptist, Methodist, or Church of Christ denominations.

The Mills County Historical Commission details fifty-seven cemeteries in Mills County. Early settlers buried their dead near their homes in post oak slabs fashioned into coffins by the local carpenter.

Economy and industry 

The county has historically sustained its economy with farming and ranching operations of varying sizes, with small businesses and recreational hunting providing additional income. Agritourism, including recreational hunting and fishing, continues to supplement the economy.

Mineral resources in the county are minimal: a small vein of coal was discovered near Ebony around 1950, and Weston No. 1 Well, located in the Rock Springs Community, produced very little gas and oil. Much later, in 1982, oil made another appearance, leading to 28,122 barrels, yet by 1990, oil production ceased.

Farming and ranching

Statistics 

Records show that the county has featured a large population of sheep and goats. Sheep reached a peak of 133,737 head in 1940, and goats reached a peak of 118,009 in 1964. Cattle fluctuated from a low of 16,279 head in 1940 to a high of 48,901 in 1978. Total animal units in the county was 41,745 in 1935 before reaching a peak of 69,429 AU in 1969.  The 2012 agricultural census reported 34,294 sheep, 23,325 goats, and 32,663 head of cattle, with 42,568 AU. Average ranch size was 109 hectares in 1935 before reaching a peak size of 256 hectares in 1969. The 2012 agricultural census reported a decrease to an average size of 219 hectares.

By 1890, there were 680 farms and ranches in the county, consisting of 142,299 acres, with 25,000 head of cattle and 23,000 sheep.

By 1930, the county produced 32,000 acres of cotton, 21,300 head of cattle, 68,000 goats (many raised for mohair), 78,000 sheep, and 67,000 chickens.

General history 
The natural resources of pre-Mills county in Brown, Comanche, Hamilton, and Lampasas counties offered good support for early farming and ranching, yet most of the early settlers made their living by hunting. Game provided food and pelts were often sent to Houston to sell. By the early 1890s, large game such as bear, panther, and jaguar had been evacuated from the county, leaving hunters smaller game such as bobcat, fox, wolf, coon, and possums. Game was the only substantive food for early settlers; deer, however, served various needs: in many households, they were the main meat and they sold antler and skins.

One report from 1957 identifies only nineteen percent of the land can be tilled, placing an emphasis on grazing land.

The cattle industry traces it beginnings to the first herd of long-horn cattle that arrived in Mills County in 1865, brought by J.H. Flower, which was followed shortly after by a huge herd purchased by John Williams. The yearling sale at Williams Ranch attracted buyers from Kansas or the Indian Territory. Cattle roamed the open range before settlers started fencing their land in the mid-1860s. Barbed wire arrived in 1875 and by 1879 was widely available in Texas. Land owners often fenced in areas they did not own that sometimes included public water sources for livestock, which led to a fence-cutting epidemic in the mid-1880s, leading to legislation forbidding it. A severe drought in 1886 and 1887 led to cattle and horse deaths; whole herds of cattle left the country looking for water, and their owners sometime spent days hunting for them. Some ranchers drove the herds to other parts of Texas to find water.

Most of the early pioneers brought sheep when they arrived. Owners clipped wool by hand and sent the fiber by wagon train to be sold in Houston. The first local to have a sizable sheep herd was Eli Fairman, known as "Sheepman" Fairman. Sheep and goats are credited with improving the economy of Mills County more than cattle, largely due to stable prices and the county having optimal conditions for raising them. For years, Mills County ranked second in the state for wool and mohair production. As of 1976, Mills County ranked highest in the state for lamb feeding operations. Turkey and egg production were also once leading businesses in the county. Hogs were once raised county-wide for meat.

The cattle industry, from the beginning, has exhibited wild swings in prices in response to many factors, yet it remains a mainstay industry in Mills County. Early cattle trade in Mills County relied on the Fort Worth Stockyards for selling, but the local auction ring effected higher prices through bidding, rather than waiting to receive an offer from a buyer who came to visit a rancher's stock . Robert Briley started the first local auction that changed hands many times to become the Mills County Livestock Commission of Goldthwaite. Later to be called the Mills County Commission Company, at one time it was the largest sheep and goat sale in the world. An industry related to livestock buying and selling was the trucking business, which started before local auctions. Early trucking, which only required a license and an railroad permit, was pioneered by Everett Holland and Lindsay Kettle from Mullin and Slim Hurst from Star.

The first farmer in pre-Mills county used three basic tools: a walking turning plow, a walking planter, and a walking cultivator.By 1864, settlers started growing and harvesting cotton—the first bale of cotton was picked by W.F. Brown and ginned in Comanche. By 1910, cotton acreage had ballooned to 46,000; it was the main crop from 1887 through 1917. In 1899, The Goldthwaite Eagle published that "some of the farmers [in Pleasant Grove] have plowed up their wheat and planted cotton, calculating on 4 cents per pound ... we fear as long as cotton is the principle crop at the above prices our country will remain in an embarrassed condition financially." As the land was turned over to cotton, the cattle business shifted into western Texas. Families worked together during cotton picking time to collect bales that would be taken to town to sell. World War I disrupted the economy and effected crop diversification in Mills County, leading to a decline in cotton production. Cotton acreage reached a low of 2,078 in 1959, exacerbated by the boll weevil.

By around 1912, most families owned a small amount of stock and farmed small grain as a necessity. At about the same time, steam threshers hit the market in Mills County. Before then, farmers relied on horse-powered threshers. Threshing was typically part of a community effort that included neighbors who hauled the grain to the barn and women that helped cook meals. A crew consisted of an engine man, fireman, separator man, sack holders, pitchders, and grain and water wagon drivers. Steam threshing crews could be "dependent" or "independent," which classified whether the wife of the crop's owner had to supply meals. Most of the later crews were "independent," which meant they had their own cook shack. During this time, around ten threshing crews worked the summer months in Mills County. Combines appeared suddenly in Mills County, pushing out not only threshing machines but also reapers by 1939. The Goldthwaite Eagle published the first image of a tractor in the summer of 1915, a Case Model 10-20.

In 1912, the Santa Fe Railroad published a pamphlet, Practical Information for the Farmers of Central West Texas, which  provided crop and livestock recommendations that the company claimed would thrive in the county. The publication also espoused the importance of agricultural diversification.

Agricultural extension services started in Mills County around 1914.

The 1920s brought prosperity to Mills County, yet booming oil business opportunities outside of Mills County caused many citizens to move for better pay. The Great Depression devastated the county, just as it did the rest of the country. Í Depression relief programs provided by the U.S. Government were headquartered in the courthouse with E.B. Gilliam as administrator, yet Mills County's needs were not as severe as other counties in Central Texas. One form of recovery that helped Mills County was the Agriculture Adjustment Act.

In 1925, J.L. Corts established the first dairy about three miles southwest Goldthwaite called the "Regular Diary Farm. The first Mills County cheese factory opened in Goldthwaite in 1928. Also around this time, cold storage developed as both a stand-alone industry and also became a means to enhance other industries such as poultry.

The Great Depression signaled a general decline in Mills County farming (and overall population), leading to an upswing in mohair goats and sheep, as well as farm consolidations.

The Soil Bank Program under the Eisenhower administration in the 1950s paid farmers to transform under-producing farmland to pastureland, and most of the land never returned to production.

Starting in the 1970s and early 1980s, the county gained a number of manufacturing companies; by 1982, there were eight manufacturers employing one-hundred people.

Mills County is a demonstrated leader in Texas pecan production. In fact, pecans are credited as one of the most lucrative crops in the early days of Mills County, fetching about four cents per pound. Pecan harvesting as a business was partly accelerated by the invention of the pecan shaker by O.L. Sides and his sons, W.L. and C.N. Sides. In the early days, pecan crops were typically sold at markets in Houston. In 1905, one Mills County citizen reported earnings of $49.10 from a single tree. By 1929, pecan production had developed into a solid industry mostly in the southern part of the county and became a recognized center for development of new varieties. 174,637 bushels of improved pecans were harvested in 1950, and in 1954 statistics reported 58,092 pecan trees and 385,792 pounds of pecans. With over 800 acres of trees in the county, Dewayn McCasland has become a nationwide expert on pecans.

Truck farming also had its day in Mills County: one successful operation was Riverside Farm, owned by J.J. Cockrell near the Colorado River, which once had one hundred acres cultivated in a variety of fruits and a one-hundred tree pecan orchard.

Renewable energy 
There are currently three wind energy projects operating in Mills County that feature a total of 236 turbines that generate an estimated 616 MW of power. A fourth project, Castle Gap Wind, will add 197 MW of power capacity [though part of the project is in Lampasas County].

 Flat Top Wind I LLC
 Goldthwaite Wind Energy LLC
 Priddy Wind Project LLC

Law and government 
Mills County's governing body is a commissioner's court operating under Dillon's Rule, consisting of a county judge and four commissioners.

Education 

Early settlers taught their children the rudiments of reading, writing, and arithmetic at home when time allowed and within the limited boundaries of what they knew. The first schools were held in the summertime under brush arbors, and teachers' meager pay was supplemented by gifts of provisions and free rent. Attendance was poor due to the long distances that students had to travel. Taught self-reliance and independence at home, lots of students defied the direction of teachers. One of the early school teachers before Mills County was Phil H. Clements, who was teaching in 1878 after moving to Williams Ranch. The concept of grades did not exist in the early days: students were classified according to reading level, e.g. second reader. Often older, advanced students were called upon to teacher their juniors.

School buildings started appearing in the 1860s and early 1870s, which were constructed by local men of logs with dirt floors, appointed with split-log benches and fireplaces, which a few years later were replaced by wood stoves. Eventually log schools evolved into lumber-based buildings as material became available. Schools usually had one room that had partitions made of panels or curtains for classrooms. Books were donated by parents. Most early schools had a tower with a bell, which rang out to announce the start of the school day. Most also had a stage with a curtain made of advertising squares promoting local merchants, along with artistic embellishments, which was a source of community pride. State support of pre-Mills County schools was minimal in the early days: for instance, Williams Ranch received ninety-nine dollars in 1878. Students brought simple lunches in lard buckets, usually consisting of leftover bisquits. In the early days, only Goldthwaite, Mullin, Priddy, and Star offered high school diplomas.

An important order of business at the first meeting of the Mills County Commissioner's Court on October 12, 1887, was to incorporate schools that existed at the time into the a new county educational system, including establishing local school taxes. 

In 1900, Mr. and Mrs. T.W. Hatcher organized the Mills County Institute, also known as Hatcher University, in Goldthwaite on Fisher Street. It closed in 1907.

In 1907, the "Self Culture Club" opened the first community library in the M.L. Brown Drug Store. Miss Alline Howell, a teacher at the Rye Valley School, gathered community support to open the first county school library in 1915. Its first collection of books were purchased as a lot from Farm and Ranch Magazine.

By 1910, there were fifty-two public schools in Mills County with sixty-five teachers, and by 1976, there were eighty-one schools.

During the 1930s, with teachers desperate for jobs, school boards were able to make strenuous demands of teachers, often requiring them to live in the community where they taught, agree to leave the community only one weekend per month, participate in various community events, and sometimes agree to not marry.

The Star School building, erected in 1940, is the only school in the county to be built by the W.P.A.

Today Mills County has four consolidated schools: Goldthwaite, Mullin, and Priddy [source included Star, which consolidated with Goldthwaite Consolidated ISD on July 1, 2014].

Recreation 

The early county residents enjoyed a number of diversions, including dancing, attending movies, running horse races, going to town on Saturdays, and drinking at the saloons. The first Mills County fairgrounds, located on the south side of Goldthwaite to the east of Livestock Commission Company, had a number of features, including a race track, baseball and football fields, an exhibition building, a band and dance platform, and sometimes a skating rink. It also hosted a carnival. All Goldthwaite football games were held at the football field at the fairgrounds—without bleachers–until a stadium was built near the school in the late 1930s. The circus, hosted in Goldthwaite, also attracted residents from across the county. Another regular diversion for county residents were medicine shows, held in Goldthwaite, in which proprietors put on an entertaining show designed to sell nostrums. In the 1920s, Lake Merrit attracted many Mills County residents, who camped and swam there.

Goldthwaite is home to the Texas State Championship BBQ & Goat Cook-off, which was started in 1996.

An abundance of deer, dove, hogs, turkey, and small game attracts recreational hunters from Texas and beyond. Fishing is also a popular activity in the county.

Politics 

In a groundbreaking political study published in 1964, Mills County was identified as being entrenched in liberalism with voters overwhelmingly supporting Democratic politicians, owing to the county's southern heritage of liberal populism and single-party politics. In 2010, The Goldthwaite Eagle reported the county's dramatic shift to the Republican party following a long history of landslide Democratic voting in local elections.

Votes cast at the county's general election for November 8, 2022, showed a 90% Republican and 10% Democratic split.

Historical notes 
The Populist Party was at its height in Mills County towards the end of the nineteenth century.

A prohibition movement starting in the late nineteenth and early twentieth centuries lead to a ban on alcohol in the Goldthwaite School District; in 1908, liquor ban went into effect for the whole county. A local option election held on November 8, 2016, lifted the ban on alcohol sales within the Goldthwaite city limits (357 votes for and 277 against).

A special buffalo bar-b-que organized by a number of local businessman in 1948 welcomed Lyndon B. Johnson, who arrived by helicopter and delivered a speech to a crowd of 2,500 at the baseball field near Lampasas Commission Company.

Media

The first known newspaper, preceding the formation of Mills County, was the Rancho Rackett, which started around 1880 at Williams Ranch. A broadside appeared in Goldthwaite, printed on a portable press by Lampasas resident "Calamity" Bonner, and is credited as the first paper distributed in the town. The Goldthwaite Mountaineer was published by W.H. Thompson starting on March 5, 1886, before ending publication in 1898 under Col. J.K. Street and merging with the Brownwood Record. Col. Street, after publishing The Goldthwaite Mountaineer for about three months, determined that the town could not sustain two newspapers. The first profitable weekly newspaper, The Mountain Eagle, was established by W.H. Thompson and R.M. Thompson in 1894. An early issue of the paper identifies itself as "the organ of Mills County." The same year a weekly called The Mills County Advocate commenced publication. In 1896, The Mountain Eagle was sold, and its name changed to The Goldthwaite Eagle. The Mullin Enterprise, which began in 1902, merged with The Eagle in 1950.

Mills County is part of the Waco/Temple/Killeen (Central Texas) DMA. Local media outlets include: KCEN-TV, KWTX-TV, KXXV-TV, KDYW, KWKT-TV and KNCT-TV. Two other television stations from the Abilene/Sweetwater/Brownwood DMA provide coverage for Mills County, KTAB-TV and KRBC-TV. KRNR FM 92.7, "Redneck Radio," currently broadcasts from Goldthwaite. During the 1920s, a radio station owned by the Eagle Publishing Company, KGKB (frequency 1070 KC), broadcast from The Goldthwaite Eagle editorial offices before moving to Brownwood.

Transportation 
Pioneers traveled through pre-Mills County by wagon pulled by ox, mule, or horse teams on primitive clearings through wooded areas or via crude trails that were often nearly impassable in wet conditions due to mud holes. Rivers were forded, but some waterways had log bridges. They went to Waco or Houston for supplies—a round trip to Waco took seven to ten days. Freight wagons moved the same way loaded with hogs, wood, hides, pelts, and pecans to be traded for supplies, and they were sometimes followed by a herd of cattle.

In 1901, before the Texas Highway Department was formed, county roads were maintained via a $3.00-per-person tax, known as the "road tax." Instead of paying the tax, a person could work three days a week on the road or hire someone else to take his place.

Railroad 

The railroad had a profound impact on the development of the county. In 1885, the Gulf, Colorado, and Santa Fe Railroad laid tracks through Goldthwaite, Pegtown, and Mullin, then onto Brownwood, bypassing Williams Ranch and Center City, both of which had anticipated being stops. The primary impetus for the railroad to pass through the county was to reach San Angelo livestock markets.

The railroad created Goldthwaite and Mullin, similar to about twenty other townsites the railroad platted and auctioned along its path. On September 2, 1885, two years before Mills County formed, a GC&SFR train made a stop at Goldthwaite (then in Brown County), and on that day Thos. W. Jackson, Santa Fe Land Commissioner, begin auctioning lots that would be the foundation of the town. On December 31, 1885, regular train service began in Goldthwaite, with the town serving as a division point. By 1886, the railroad was the largest employer in the county, with thirty-six in its workforce. In 1905, the railroad boosted land ownership and farming in Mills County by offering employees the option to purchase land along its tracks through payroll deductions.

Major highways
 •  U.S. Highway 84

 •  U.S. Highway 183

 •  State Highway 16

Mail 
Before the postal service arrived in pre-Mills County in the late 1870s, mail was carried by travelers or cowboys from San Saba. The earliest known postmaster in the area was James D. Williams at Williams Ranch, who was appointed on January 16, 1877. Miss Dera Humphries is recognized as first woman mail carrier in Mills County, serving from 1921 to 1941.

Significant structures 

Mills County's first courthouse, officially recognized on June 25, 1890, was built by John Cormack of Lampasas and paid by bonds amounting to $27,500. On May 5, 1912, the courthouse burned, allegedly by arson. After the fire, a controversy erupted over whether the replacement courthouse should be built in Goldthwaite or Mullin, some arguing that Mullin was closer to the center of the county and should be named the new county seat. The Texas Land Commissioner located the center of the county, closer to Goldthwaite, and marked it with a bronze marker designated "Center Point." Goldthwaite would remain the county seat. Later that year, the county hired Henry T. Phelps to design and specify a new courthouse, and construction was completed by Gordon-Jones Construction Company on November 17, 1913, at a cost of around $69,000. In 1915 during Jim Crow, a Confederate Memorial Monument was placed on the courthouse grounds in Goldthwaite, funded by public donations, the civic organization Self Culture Club, Jeff Davis Camp 117, and the United Confederate Veterans.

Court records reveal that the first jail in Mills County, an eight-foot square building called the "Goldthwaite Calaboose," was ordered to be built in 1887 at a cost of $15.00. The same year, a larger jail that still stands was built at a cost of $8,850. It received a Recorded Texas Historic Landmark designation in 1965 and has been on the National Register of Historic Places since 1979.

See also
 List of counties in Texas
 National Register of Historic Places listings in Mills County, Texas
 Recorded Texas Historic Landmarks in Mills County

External links
 Mills County Profile - County Information Program, Texas Association of Counties
 
 Legislation Creating Mills County - Legislative Reference Library of Texas

References